Thaix is a commune in the Nièvre department in central France.

Geography
The river Alène forms all of the commune's southern border.

Demographics
On 1 January 2019, the estimated population was 46.

See also
Communes of the Nièvre department

References

Communes of Nièvre
Nièvre communes articles needing translation from French Wikipedia